

Events

Pre-1600
587 BC – The Neo-Babylonian Empire sacks Jerusalem and destroys the First Temple. 
 615 – Pakal ascends the throne of Palenque at the age of 12.
 904 – Sack of Thessalonica: Saracen raiders under Leo of Tripoli sack Thessaloniki, the Byzantine Empire's second-largest city, after a short siege, and plunder it for a week.
 923 – Battle of Firenzuola: Lombard forces under King Rudolph II and Adalbert I, margrave of Ivrea, defeat the dethroned Emperor Berengar I of Italy at Firenzuola (Tuscany).
1014 – Byzantine–Bulgarian wars: Battle of Kleidion: Byzantine emperor Basil II inflicts a decisive defeat on the Bulgarian army, and his subsequent treatment of 15,000 prisoners reportedly causes Tsar Samuil of Bulgaria to die of a heart attack less than three months later, on October 6.
1018 – Count Dirk III defeats an army sent by Emperor Henry II in the Battle of Vlaardingen.
1030 – Ladejarl-Fairhair succession wars: Battle of Stiklestad: King Olaf II fights and dies trying to regain his Norwegian throne from the Danes.
1148 – The Siege of Damascus ends in a decisive crusader defeat and leads to the disintegration of the Second Crusade.
1565 – The widowed Mary, Queen of Scots marries Henry Stuart, Lord Darnley, Duke of Albany, at Holyrood Palace, Edinburgh, Scotland.
1567 – The infant James VI is crowned King of Scotland at Stirling.
1588 – Anglo-Spanish War: Battle of Gravelines: English naval forces under the command of Lord Charles Howard and Sir Francis Drake defeat the Spanish Armada off the coast of Gravelines, France.

1601–1900
1693 – War of the Grand Alliance: Battle of Landen: France wins a victory over Allied forces in the Netherlands.
1775 – Founding of the U.S. Army Judge Advocate General's Corps: General George Washington appoints William Tudor as Judge Advocate of the Continental Army.
1818 – French physicist Augustin Fresnel submits his prizewinning "Memoir on the Diffraction of Light", precisely accounting for the limited extent to which light spreads into shadows, and thereby demolishing the oldest objection to the wave theory of light.
1836 – Inauguration of the Arc de Triomphe in Paris, France.
1848 – Great Famine of Ireland: Tipperary Revolt: In County Tipperary, Ireland, then in the United Kingdom, an unsuccessful nationalist revolt against British rule is put down by police.
1851 – Annibale de Gasparis discovers asteroid 15 Eunomia.
1858 – United States and Japan sign the Harris Treaty.
1862 – American Civil War: Confederate spy Belle Boyd is arrested by Union troops and detained at the Old Capitol Prison in Washington, D.C.
1871 – The Connecticut Valley Railroad opens between Old Saybrook, Connecticut and Hartford, Connecticut in the United States.
1899 – The First Hague Convention is signed.
1900 – In Italy, King Umberto I of Italy is assassinated by the anarchist Gaetano Bresci. His son, Victor Emmanuel III, 31 years old, succeed to the throne.

1901–present
1901 – Land lottery begins in Oklahoma.
1907 – Sir Robert Baden-Powell sets up the Brownsea Island Scout camp in Poole Harbour on the south coast of England. The camp runs from August 1 to August 9 and is regarded as the foundation of the Scouting movement.
1914 – The Cape Cod Canal opened.
1920 – Construction of the Link River Dam begins as part of the Klamath Reclamation Project.
1921 – Adolf Hitler becomes leader of the National Socialist German Workers' Party.
1932 – Great Depression: In Washington, D.C., troops disperse the last of the "Bonus Army" of World War I veterans.
1937 – Tōngzhōu Incident: In Tōngzhōu, China, the East Hopei Army attacks Japanese troops and civilians.
1945 – The BBC Light Programme radio station is launched for mainstream light entertainment and music.
1948 – Olympic Games: The Games of the XIV Olympiad: After a hiatus of 12 years caused by World War II, the first Summer Olympics to be held since the 1936 Summer Olympics in Berlin, open in London.
1950 – Korean War: After four days, the No Gun Ri Massacre ends when the US Army 7th Cavalry Regiment is withdrawn.
1957 – The International Atomic Energy Agency is established.
  1957   – Tonight Starring Jack Paar premieres on NBC with Jack Paar beginning the modern day talk show.
1958 – U.S. President Dwight D. Eisenhower signs into law the National Aeronautics and Space Act, which creates the National Aeronautics and Space Administration (NASA).
1959 – First United States Congress elections in Hawaii as a state of the Union.
1965 – Vietnam War: The first 4,000 101st Airborne Division paratroopers arrive in Vietnam, landing at Cam Ranh Bay.
1967 – Vietnam War: Off the coast of North Vietnam the  catches on fire in the worst U.S. naval disaster since World War II, killing 134.
  1967   – During the fourth day of celebrating its 400th anniversary, the city of Caracas, Venezuela is shaken by an earthquake, leaving approximately 500 dead.
1973 – Greeks vote to abolish the monarchy, beginning the first period of the Metapolitefsi.
  1973   – Driver Roger Williamson is killed during the Dutch Grand Prix, after a suspected tire failure causes his car to pitch into the barriers at high speed.
1976 – In New York City, David Berkowitz (a.k.a. the "Son of Sam") kills one person and seriously wounds another in the first of a series of attacks.
1980 – Iran adopts a new "holy" flag after the Islamic Revolution.
1981 – A worldwide television audience of around 750 million people watch the wedding of Charles, Prince of Wales, and Lady Diana Spencer at St Paul's Cathedral in London.
  1981   – After impeachment on June 21, Abolhassan Banisadr flees with Massoud Rajavi to Paris, in an Iranian Air Force Boeing 707, piloted by Colonel Behzad Moezzi, to form the National Council of Resistance of Iran.
1987 – British Prime Minister Margaret Thatcher and President of France François Mitterrand sign the agreement to build a tunnel under the English Channel (Eurotunnel).
  1987   – Prime Minister of India Rajiv Gandhi and President of Sri Lanka J. R. Jayewardene sign the Indo-Sri Lanka Accord on ethnic issues.
1993 – The Supreme Court of Israel acquits alleged Nazi death camp guard John Demjanjuk of all charges and he is set free.
1996 – The child protection portion of the Communications Decency Act is struck down by a U.S. federal court as too broad.
2005 – Astronomers announce their discovery of the dwarf planet Eris.
2010 – An overloaded passenger ferry capsizes on the Kasai River in Bandundu Province, Democratic Republic of the Congo, resulting in at least 80 deaths.
2013 – Two passenger trains collide in the Swiss municipality of Granges-près-Marnand near Lausanne injuring 25 people.
2015 – The first piece of suspected debris from Malaysia Airlines Flight 370 is discovered on Réunion Island.
2019 – The 2019 Altamira prison riot between rival Brazilian drug gangs leaves 62 dead.
2021 - The International Space Station temporarily spins out of control, moving the ISS 45 degrees out of attitude, following an engine malfunction of Russian module Nauka.

Births

Pre-1600
 869 – Muhammad al-Mahdi, The 12th Imam of  Muslims (Shiites)  (d. 941)
 996 – Fujiwara no Norimichi, Japanese nobleman (d. 1075) 
1166 – Henry II, French nobleman and king of Jerusalem (d. 1197)
1356 – Martin the Elder, king of Aragon, Valencia and Majorca  (d. 1410)
1537 – Pedro Téllez-Girón, Spanish nobleman (d. 1590)
1573 – Philip II, duke of Pomerania-Stettin (d. 1618)
1580 – Francesco Mochi, Italian sculptor (d. 1654)

1601–1900
1605 – Simon Dach, German poet and hymn-writer (d. 1659)
1646 – Johann Theile, German organist and composer (d. 1724)
1744 – Giulio Maria della Somaglia, Italian cardinal (d. 1830)
1763 – Philip Charles Durham, Scottish admiral and politician (d. 1845)
1797 – Daniel Drew, American businessman and financier (d. 1879)
1801 – George Bradshaw, English cartographer and publisher (d. 1853)
1805 – Alexis de Tocqueville, French historian and philosopher (d. 1859)
1806 – Horace Abbott, American businessman and banker (d. 1887)
1817 – Ivan Aivazovsky, Armenian-Russian painter and illustrator (d. 1900)
  1817   – Martin Körber, Baltic German pastor, composer, and conductor (d. 1893) 
1841 – Gerhard Armauer Hansen, Norwegian physician (d. 1912)
1843 – Johannes Schmidt, German linguist and academic (d. 1901)
1846 – Sophie Menter, German pianist and composer (d. 1918)
  1846   – Isabel, Brazilian princess  (d. 1921)
1849 – Max Nordau, Hungarian physician, author, and critic, co-founded the World Zionist Organization (d. 1923)
1859 – Francisco Rodrigues da Cruz, Portuguese priest (d. 1948)
1860 – Charles Cochrane-Baillie, 2nd Baron Lamington, English politician, 8th Governor of Queensland (d. 1940)
1867 – Berthold Oppenheim, Moravian rabbi (d. 1942)
1869 – Booth Tarkington,  American novelist and dramatist (d. 1946)
1871 – Jakob Mändmets, Estonian writer and journalist (d. 1930)
1872 – Eric Alfred Knudsen, American author, lawyer, and politician (d. 1957)
1874 – J. S. Woodsworth, Canadian minister and politician (d. 1942)
1876 – Maria Ouspenskaya, Russian-American actress and acting teacher (d. 1949)
1878 – Don Marquis, American author, poet, and playwright (d. 1937)
1883 – Porfirio Barba-Jacob, Colombian poet and author (d. 1942)
  1883   – Benito Mussolini, Italian fascist revolutionary and politician, 27th Prime Minister of Italy (d. 1945)
1884 – Ralph Austin Bard, American financier and politician, 2nd Under Secretary of the Navy (d. 1975)
1885 – Theda Bara, American actress (d. 1955)
1887 – Sigmund Romberg, Hungarian-American pianist and composer (d. 1951)
1888 – Vladimir K. Zworykin, Russian-American engineer, invented the Iconoscope (d. 1982)
1891 – Bernhard Zondek, German-Israeli gynecologist and academic (d. 1966)
1892 – William Powell, American actor and singer (d. 1984)
1896 – Maria L. de Hernández, Mexican-American rights activist (d. 1986)
1897 – Neil Ritchie, Guyanese-English general (d. 1983)
1898 – Isidor Isaac Rabi, American physicist and academic, Nobel Prize Laureate (d. 1988)
1899 – Walter Beall, American baseball player (d. 1959)
1900 – Mary V. Austin, Australian community worker and political activist (d. 1986)  
  1900   – Eyvind Johnson, Swedish novelist and short story writer, Nobel Prize Laureate (d. 1976)
  1900   – Teresa Noce, Italian labor leader, activist, and journalist (d. 1980)
  1900   – Don Redman, American composer, and bandleader (d. 1964)

1901–present
1904 – Mahasi Sayadaw, Burmese monk and philosopher (d. 1982)
  1904   – J. R. D. Tata, French-Indian pilot and businessman, founded Tata Motors and Tata Global Beverages (d. 1993)
1905 – Clara Bow, American actress (d. 1965)
  1905   – Dag Hammarskjöld, Swedish economist and diplomat, 2nd Secretary-General of the United Nations, Nobel Prize Laureate (d. 1961)
  1905   – Stanley Kunitz, American poet and translator (d. 2006)
1906 – Thelma Todd, American actress and singer (d. 1935)
1907 – Melvin Belli, American lawyer (d. 1996)
1909 – Samm Sinclair Baker, American author (d. 1997)
  1909   – Chester Himes, American-Spanish author (d. 1984)
1910 – Gale Page, American actress (d. 1983)
1911 – Foster Furcolo, American lawyer and politician, 60th Governor of Massachusetts (d. 1995)
  1911   – Archbishop Iakovos of America (d. 2005)
1913 – Erich Priebke, German war criminal, leader of the 1944 Ardeatine massacre (d. 2013)
1914 – Irwin Corey, American actor and activist (d. 2017)
1915 – Bruce R. McConkie, American colonel and religious leader (d. 1985)
  1915   – Francis W. Sargent, American soldier and politician, 64th Governor of Massachusetts (d. 1998)
1916 – Budd Boetticher, American director, producer, and screenwriter (d. 2001)
  1916   – Charlie Christian, American guitarist (d. 1942)
  1916   – Rupert Hamer, Australian politician, 39th Premier of Victoria (d. 2004)
1917 – Rochus Misch, German SS officer (d. 2013)
1918 – Don Ingalls, American writer and producer (d. 2014)
  1918   – Edwin O'Connor, American journalist and author (d. 1968)
  1918   – Mary Lee Settle, American novelist, essayist, and memoirist (d. 2005)
1920 – Neville Jeffress, Australian businessman (d. 2007)
1921 – Richard Egan, American actor (d. 1987)
  1921   – Chris Marker, French photographer and journalist (d. 2012)
1923 – George Burditt, American screenwriter and producer (d. 2013)
  1923   – Edgar Cortright, American scientist and engineer (d. 2014)
  1923   – Jim Marshall, English businessman, founded Marshall Amplification (d. 2012)
  1923   – Gordon Mitchell, American bodybuilder and actor (d. 2003)
1924 – Lloyd Bochner, Canadian-American actor (d. 2005)
  1924   – Robert Horton, American actor (d. 2016)
1925 – Harold W. Kuhn, American mathematician and academic (d. 2014)
  1925   – Ted Lindsay, Canadian ice hockey player, manager, and sportscaster (d. 2019)
  1925   – Mikis Theodorakis, Greek composer (d. 2021)
1926 – Robert Kilpatrick, Baron Kilpatrick of Kincraig, Scottish physician, academic, and politician (d. 2015)
1927 – Harry Mulisch, Dutch author, poet, and playwright (d. 2010)
1930 – Paul Taylor, American dancer and choreographer (d. 2018)
1931 – Kjell Karlsen, Norwegian pianist, composer, and bandleader (d. 2020)
1932 – Leslie Fielding, English diplomat (d. 2021)
  1932   – Nancy Kassebaum, American businesswoman and politician
1933 – Lou Albano, Italian-American wrestler, manager, and actor (d. 2009)
  1933   – Colin Davis, English race car driver (d. 2012)
  1933   – Robert Fuller, American actor and rancher
  1933   – Randy Sparks, American folk singer-songwriter and musician
1935 – Peter Schreier, German tenor and conductor (d. 2019)
1936 – Elizabeth Dole, American lawyer and politician, 20th United States Secretary of Labor
1937 – Daniel McFadden, American economist and academic, Nobel Prize Laureate
1938 – Peter Jennings, Canadian-American journalist and author (d. 2005)
  1938   – Jean Rochon, Canadian physician and politician (d. 2021)
1940 – Betty Harris, American chemist
  1940   – Winnie Monsod, Filipina economist and political commentator
1941 – Jennifer Dunn, American engineer and politician (d. 2007)
  1941   – Goenawan Mohamad, Indonesian poet and playwright
  1941   – David Warner, English actor (d. 2022)
1942 – Doug Ashdown, Australian singer-songwriter
  1942   – Tony Sirico, American actor (d. 2022)
1943 – David Taylor, English snooker player and sportscaster
1944 – Jim Bridwell, American rock climber and mountaineer (d. 2018)
1945 – Sharon Creech, American author and educator
  1945   – Mircea Lucescu, Romanian footballer, coach, and manager
1946 – Ximena Armas, Chilean painter
  1946   – Stig Blomqvist, Swedish race car driver
  1946   – Neal Doughty, American keyboard player, songwriter, and producer 
  1946   – Alessandro Gogna, Italian mountaineer and adventurer
  1946   – Diane Keen, English actress
  1946   – Aleksei Tammiste, Estonian basketball player
1947 – Dick Harmon, American golfer and coach (d. 2006)
1948 – John Clarke, New Zealand-Australian comedian, actor, producer, and screenwriter (d. 2017)
1949 – Leslie Easterbrook, American actress
  1949   – Jamil Mahuad, Ecuadorian lawyer and politician, 51st President of Ecuador
1950 – Jenny Holzer, American painter, author, and dancer
1951 – Susan Blackmore, English psychologist and theorist
  1951   – Dan Driessen, American baseball player and coach
  1951   – Dean Pitchford, American actor, director, screenwriter, and composer
1952 – Norman Blackwell, Baron Blackwell, English businessman and politician
  1952   – Joe Johnson, English snooker player and sportscaster
  1952   – Marie Panayotopoulos-Cassiotou, Greek politician
1953 – Ken Burns, American director and producer
  1953   – Geddy Lee, Canadian musician
  1953   – Frank McGuinness, Irish poet and playwright
  1953   – Tim Gunn, American television host and actor
1954 – Patti Scialfa, American musician 
1955 – Jean-Hugues Anglade, French actor, director, and screenwriter
  1955   – Dave Stevens, American illustrator (d. 2008)
  1955   – Stephen Timms, English politician, Minister of State for Competitiveness
1956 – Teddy Atlas, American boxer, trainer, and sportscaster
  1956   – Ronnie Musgrove, American lawyer and politician, 62nd Governor of Mississippi
  1956   – Faustino Rupérez, Spanish cyclist
1957 – Liam Davison, Australian author and educator (d. 2014)
  1957   – Viktor Gavrikov, Lithuanian-Swiss chess player (d. 2016)
  1957   – Nellie Kim, Russian gymnast and coach
1958 – Gail Dines, English-American author, activist, and academic
  1958   – Simon Nye, English screenwriter and producer
  1958   – Cynthia Rowley, American fashion designer
1959 – Sanjay Dutt, Indian actor, singer, and producer
  1959   – Ruud Janssen, Dutch blogger and illustrator
  1959   – Dave LaPoint, American baseball player and manager
  1959   – John Sykes, English singer-songwriter and guitarist 
1960 – Didier Van Cauwelaert, French author
1962 – Carl Cox, English DJ and producer
  1962   – Frank Neubarth, German footballer and manager
  1962   – Scott Steiner, American wrestler
  1962   – Vincent Rousseau, Belgian runner
  1962   – Isabel Cristina Mrad Campos, Young Brazilian victim of feminicide declared blessed by Roman Catholicism (d. 1982)
1963 – Hans-Holger Albrecht, Belgian-German businessman 
  1963   – Jim Beglin, Irish footballer and sportscaster
  1963   – Julie Elliott, English politician
  1963   – Azeem Hafeez, Pakistani cricketer
  1963   – Alexandra Paul, American actress and producer
  1963   – Graham Poll, English footballer, referee, and journalist
1964 – Jaanus Veensalu, Estonian footballer
1965 – Luis Alicea, Puerto Rican-American baseball player and coach
  1965   – Dean Haglund, Canadian actor, producer, and screenwriter
  1965   – Adam Holloway, English captain and politician
  1965   – Stan Koziol, American soccer player (d. 2014)
  1965   – Chang-Rae Lee, South Korean-American author and academic
  1965   – Xavier Waterkeyn, Australian author
  1965   – Woody Weatherman, American guitarist and songwriter 
1966 – Sally Gunnell, English hurdler and sportscaster
  1966   – Stuart Lampitt, English cricketer
  1966   – Martina McBride, American singer-songwriter and producer
1968 – Gideon Henderson, English geologist and academic
  1968   – Paavo Lötjönen, Finnish cellist and educator 
1970 – Adele Griffin, American author
  1970   – Andi Peters, English journalist, actor, and producer
  1970   – John Rennie, Zimbabwean cricketer
1971 – Andrea Philipp, German sprinter
1972 – Anssi Kela, Finnish singer and songwriter
  1972   – Wil Wheaton, American actor, producer, and screenwriter
1973 – Stephen Dorff, American actor and producer
  1973   – Denis Urubko, Kazakh mountaineer
1975 – Yoshihiro Akiyama, Japanese mixed martial artist
  1975   – Lanka de Silva, Sri Lankan cricketer
  1975   – Corrado Grabbi, Italian footballer
  1975   – Jaanus Sirel, Estonian footballer
1978 – Mike Adams, American baseball player
  1978   – Marina Lazarovska, Macedonian tennis player
1979 – Karim Essediri, Tunisian footballer
  1979   – Ronald Murray, American basketball player
  1979   – Juris Umbraško, Latvian basketball player
1980 – Ryan Braun, Canadian-American baseball player
  1980   – Fernando González, Chilean tennis player
  1980   – Ben Koller, American drummer 
  1980   – John Morris, Australian rugby league player
1981 – Fernando Alonso, Spanish race car driver
  1981   – Andrés Madrid, Argentinian footballer
  1981   – Troy Perkins, American soccer player
1982 – Janez Aljančič, Slovenian footballer
  1982   – Jônatas Domingos, Brazilian footballer
  1982   – Allison Mack, American actress and criminal
1983 – Jason Belmonte, Australian bowler
  1983   – Inés Gómez Mont, Mexican journalist and actress
  1983   – Alexei Kaigorodov, Russian ice hockey player
  1983   – Jerious Norwood, American football player
  1983   – Elise Testone, American singer-songwriter
1984 – Oh Beom-seok, South Korean footballer
  1984   – Chad Billingsley, American baseball player
  1984   – Wilson Palacios, Honduran footballer
1985 – Besart Berisha, Albanian footballer
  1985   – Okinoumi Ayumi, Japanese sumo wrestler
  1985   – Simon Santoso, Indonesian badminton player
1988 – Tarjei Bø, Norwegian biathlete
1989 – Grit Šadeiko, Estonian heptathlete
1990 – Shin Se-kyung, South Korean actress, singer and model
1991 – Dale Copley, Australian rugby league player
  1991   – Irakli Logua, Russian footballer
1992 – Karen Torrez, Bolivian swimmer
1993 – Nicole Melichar, American tennis player
  1993   – Dak Prescott, American football player
1994 – Liam O'Brien, Canadian ice hockey player
1998 – Mirjam Björklund, Swedish tennis player

Deaths

Pre-1600
 238 – Balbinus, Roman emperor (b. 165)
   238   – Pupienus, Roman emperor (b. 178)
 451 – Tuoba Huang, prince of Northern Wei (b. 428)
 796 – Offa of Mercia (b. 730)
 846 – Li Shen, chancellor of the Tang Dynasty
1030 – Olaf II of Norway (b. 995)
1095 – Ladislaus I of Hungary (b. 1040)
1099 – Pope Urban II (b. 1042)
1108 – Philip I of France (b. 1052)
1236 – Ingeborg of Denmark, Queen of France (b. 1175)
1326 – Richard Óg de Burgh, 2nd Earl of Ulster (b. 1259)
1504 – Thomas Stanley, 1st Earl of Derby (b. 1435)
1507 – Martin Behaim, German-Bohemian geographer and astronomer (b. 1459)
1573 – John Caius, English physician and academic (b. 1510)

1601–1900
1612 – Jacques Bongars, French scholar and diplomat (b. 1554)
1644 – Pope Urban VIII (b. 1568)
1752 – Peter Warren, Irish admiral and politician (b. 1703)
1781 – Johann Kies, German astronomer and mathematician (b. 1713)
1792 – René Nicolas Charles Augustin de Maupeou, French lawyer and politician, Chancellor of France (b. 1714)
1813 – Jean-Andoche Junot, French general (b. 1771)
1833 – William Wilberforce, English philanthropist and politician (b. 1759)
1839 – Gaspard de Prony, French mathematician and engineer (b. 1755)
1844 – Franz Xaver Wolfgang Mozart, Austrian pianist, composer, and conductor (b. 1791)
1856 – Robert Schumann, German composer and critic (b. 1810)
1857 – Thomas Dick, Scottish minister, astronomer, and author (b. 1774)
1887 – Agostino Depretis, Italian politician, 9th Prime Minister of Italy (d. 1813)
1890 – Vincent van Gogh, Dutch painter and illustrator (b. 1853)
1895 – Floriano Peixoto, Brazilian general and politician, 2nd President of Brazil (b. 1839)
1900 – Umberto I of Italy (b. 1844)

1901–present
1908 – Marie Adam-Doerrer (b. 1838)
1913 – Tobias Asser, Dutch lawyer and jurist, Nobel Prize Laureate (b. 1838)
1918 – Ernest William Christmas, Australian-American painter (b. 1863)
1924 – Sotirios Krokidas, Greek educator and politician, 110th Prime Minister of Greece (b. 1852)
1934 – Didier Pitre, Canadian ice hockey player (b. 1883)
1938 – Nikolai Krylenko, Russian lawyer, jurist, and politician, Prosecutor General of the Russian SFSR (b. 1885)
1950 – Joe Fry, English race car driver (b. 1915)
1951 – Ali Sami Yen, Turkish footballer and manager, founded Galatasaray S.K. (b. 1886)
1954 – Coen de Koning, Dutch speed skater (b. 1879)
1960 – Hasan Saka, Turkish politician, 7th Prime Minister of Turkey (b. 1885)
1962 – Ronald Fisher, English biologist and statistician (b. 1890)
  1962   – Leonardo De Lorenzo, Italian-American flute player and educator (b. 1875)
1964 – Vean Gregg, American baseball player (b. 1885)
1966 – Johnson Aguiyi-Ironsi, Nigerian general and politician, 2nd Head of State of Nigeria (b. 1924)
  1966   – Adekunle Fajuyi, Nigerian colonel (b. 1926)
1970 – John Barbirolli, English cellist and conductor (b. 1899)
1973 – Norm Smith, Australian footballer and coach (b. 1915)
  1973   – Roger Williamson, English race car driver (b. 1948)
1974 – Cass Elliot, American singer (b. 1941)
  1974   – Erich Kästner, German author and poet (b. 1899)
1976 – Mickey Cohen, American gangster (b. 1913)
1978 – Andrzej Bogucki, Polish actor, operetta singer, and songwriter (b. 1904)
1979 – Herbert Marcuse, German sociologist and philosopher (b. 1898)
  1979   – Bill Todman, American screenwriter and producer (b. 1916)
1981 – Robert Moses, American urban planner, designed the Northern State Parkway and Southern State Parkway (b. 1888)
1982 – Harold Sakata, American wrestler and actor (b. 1920)
  1982   – Vladimir K. Zworykin, Russian-American engineer, invented the Iconoscope (b. 1889)
1983 – Luis Buñuel, Spanish actor, director, and screenwriter (b. 1900)
  1983   – Raymond Massey, Canadian-American actor and screenwriter (b. 1896)
  1983   – David Niven, English military officer and actor (b. 1910)
1984 – Fred Waring, American television host and bandleader (b. 1900)
1987 – Bibhutibhushan Mukhopadhyay, Indian author, poet, and playwright (b. 1894)
1990 – Bruno Kreisky, Austrian academic and politician, 22nd Chancellor of Austria (b. 1911)
1991 – Christian de Castries, French general (b. 1902)
1992 – Michel Larocque, Canadian ice hockey player and manager (b. 1952)
1994 – John Britton, American physician (b. 1925)
  1994   – Dorothy Hodgkin, Egyptian-English biochemist and biophysicist, Nobel Prize laureate (b. 1910)
1995 – Les Elgart, American trumpet player and bandleader (b. 1917)
1996 – Ric Nordman, Canadian businessman and politician (b. 1919)
  1996   – Marcel-Paul Schützenberger, French mathematician and theorist (b. 1920)
  1996   – Jason Thirsk, American singer and bass player (b. 1967)
1998 – Jerome Robbins, American director, producer, and choreographer (b. 1918)
2001 – Edward Gierek, Polish soldier and politician (b. 1913)
  2001   – Wau Holland, German computer scientist, co-founded Chaos Computer Club (b. 1951)
2003 – Foday Sankoh, Sierra Leonean soldier, founded the Revolutionary United Front (b. 1937)
2004 – Rena Vlahopoulou, Greek actress and singer (b. 1923)
2007 – Mike Reid, English comedian, actor, and author (b. 1940)
  2007   – Michel Serrault, French actor (b. 1928)
  2007   – Tom Snyder, American journalist and talk show host (b. 1936)
  2007   – Marvin Zindler, American journalist (b. 1921)
2008 – Bruce Edward Ivins, American scientist and bio-defense researcher (b. 1946) 
2010 – Charles E. Wicks, American chemist and academic (b. 1925)
2012 – Tatiana Egorova, Russian footballer and manager (b. 1970)
  2012   – August Kowalczyk, Polish actor and director (b. 1921)
  2012   – Chris Marker, French photographer and journalist (b. 1921)
  2012   – James Mellaart, English archaeologist and author (b. 1925)
  2012   – John Stampe, Danish footballer and coach (b. 1957)
2013 – Christian Benítez, Ecuadorian footballer (b. 1986)
  2013   – Peter Flanigan, American banker and civil servant (b. 1923)
  2013   – Tony Gaze, Australian soldier, pilot, and race car driver (b. 1920)
  2013   – Munir Hussain, Indian cricketer and sportscaster (b. 1929)
2014 – M. Caldwell Butler, American soldier, lawyer, and politician (b. 1925)
  2014   – Jon R. Cavaiani, English-American sergeant, Medal of Honor recipient (b. 1943)
  2014   – Giorgio Gaslini, Italian pianist and composer (b. 1929)
  2014   – María Antonia Iglesias, Spanish journalist and author (b. 1945)
  2014   – Péter Kiss, Hungarian engineer and politician (b. 1959)
  2014   – Idris Muhammad, American drummer and composer (b. 1939)
  2014   – Thomas R. St. George, American soldier and author (b. 1919)
2015 – Antony Holland, English-Canadian actor, director, and playwright (b. 1920)
  2015   – Peter O'Sullevan, Anglo-Irish sportscaster (b. 1918)
  2015   – Mike Pyle, American football player and sportscaster (b. 1939)
  2015   – Franklin H. Westervelt, American computer scientist, engineer, and academic (b. 1930)
2018 – Oliver Dragojević, Croatian recording artist (b. 1947) 
  2018   – Nikolai Volkoff, Yugoslav-born American professional wrestler (b. 1947)

Holidays and observances
Christian feast day:
Lazarus of Bethany
Lupus of Troyes
Martha of Bethany (Catholic, Anglican, and Lutheran Church)
Mary of Bethany
Olaf II of Norway
Simplicius, Faustinus and Beatrix
July 29 (Eastern Orthodox liturgics)
Earliest day on which Somer's Day can fall, while August 4 is the latest; celebrated on Friday before the first Monday in August. (Bermuda)
International Tiger Day
Mohun Bagan Day (India)
National Anthem Day (Romania)
National Thai Language Day (Thailand)
Ólavsøka or Olsok, opening of the Løgting session. (Faroe Islands and the Nordic countries)

References

External links

 
 
 

Days of the year
July